Harry F. Duncan (February 19, 1899 – April 17, 1992) was an American businessman known for founding Little Tavern shops. Duncan opened his first store in 1928 in Washington, DC. By 1939, the chain had grown to almost 50 stores.  Their motto was "Buy 'em by the bag."

Duncan donated to numerous organizations and charity through the Harry F. Duncan Foundation. located in Towson, Maryland.  Some of his beneficiaries include the Andrew County Museum, Boy Scouts of America, Habitat for Humanity, and American Red Cross.  He sat on the Board of Trustees for George Washington University
and received an honorary doctorate for public service from the University in 1983.

Duncan is survived by his wife, Anneliese H. Duncan, who serves as President of the Harry F. Duncan Foundation.

Although Duncan became wealthy, very little is known about his life. He was born in Savannah, Missouri with a closely knit family. Much is not disclosed about his family from Duncan as there were issues about his money and the racist remarks made by his immediate family. His closest friends was Edgar J. Hoover, head of the FBI where they would socialize often, and even give each other gifts. Including a lion rug that Hoover had hunted during one of his many hunting safaris.

References

People from Andrew County, Missouri
1899 births
1992 deaths
American food company founders
Businesspeople from Missouri
20th-century American philanthropists
20th-century American businesspeople